The Lost Children is a New Zealand drama series set in 1867. It follows four children, three of whom were shipwrecked and landed on the coast off New Plymouth, New Zealand. Siblings Ethan and Amy, who were traveling with their mother, Charlotte, from England to Canterbury; Meg, a young thief and Tama, a young Maori slave. The series was released on DVD in New Zealand in January, 2007.

Episodes
The series contained 13 episodes, the DVD case containing the following synopses:

Cast
Hudson Mills - Ethan
Mikaela Devitt - Amy
Rhys Castle Hughes - Tama
Beatrice Joblin - Meg
Tandi Wright - Charlotte
John Bach - Frank
Brian Sergent - Harold

External links
Official Site
 

New Zealand drama television series
2006 New Zealand television series debuts
2006 New Zealand television series endings
TVNZ original programming